David George Joseph Malouf AO (born 20 March 1934) is an Australian poet, novelist, short story writer, playwright and librettist. Elected a Fellow of the Royal Society of Literature in 2008, Malouf has lectured at both the University of Queensland and the University of Sydney. He also delivered the 1998 Boyer Lectures.

Malouf's 1974 collection Neighbours in a Thicket: Poems won the Grace Leven Prize for Poetry and the Australian Literature Society Gold Medal. His 1990 novel The Great World won numerous awards, including the 1991 Miles Franklin Award and Prix Femina Étranger His 1993 novel Remembering Babylon was shortlisted for the Booker Prize and won the 1994 Prix Femina Étranger, the 1994 Los Angeles Times Book Prize for Fiction, the 1995 Prix Baudelaire and the 1996 International Dublin Literary Award. Malouf was awarded the Neustadt International Prize for Literature in 2000, the Australia-Asia Literary Award in 2008 and the Australia Council Award for Lifetime Achievement in Literature in 2016. He has been mentioned as a candidate for the Nobel Prize in Literature.

Early life
Malouf was born in Brisbane, Australia, to a Christian Lebanese father and an English-born mother of Portuguese Sephardi Jewish descent. His paternal family had immigrated from Lebanon in the 1880s, while his mother's family had moved to England via the Netherlands, before migrating to Australia in 1913.

He attended Brisbane Grammar School and graduated from the University of Queensland with a B.A. degree in 1955. He lectured for a short period before moving to London, where he taught at Holland Park School, before relocating to Birkenhead in 1962. He returned to Australia in 1968, taught at his old school, and lectured in English at the Universities of Queensland and Sydney.

Personal life
Malouf identifies as gay.

He has lived in England and Tuscany, and for the past three decades spent most of his time in Sydney.

Writing
Though he would later become known abroad for his prose works, Malouf initially concentrated on poetry. His first work appeared in 1962, as part of a book he shared with three more Australian poets.

His collection Neighbours in a Thicket: Poems (1974) features childhood memories, his mother, his sister, travelling in Europe and war.

1992 brought the publication of Poems, 1959–1989. Some of his poetry was also collected in Revolving Days: Selected Poems (2008), which is divided into four sections: on childhood, then Europe, then relocating to Sydney, then travelling between Europe and Australia.

Malouf's first novel, Johnno (1975), is the semi-autobiographical tale of a young man growing up in Brisbane during the Second World War. Johnno engages in shoplifting and goes to brothels, which contrasts with his friend Dante's middle class conservatism. La Boite Theatre adapted it for stage in 2006.

Malouf began writing full-time in 1977.

An Imaginary Life (1978) is about the final years of Ovid.

Malouf's 1982 novella about three acquaintances and their experience of the First World War was titled Fly Away Peter.

His epic novel The Great World (1990) tells the story of two Australians and their relationship amid the turmoil of two World Wars, including imprisonment by the Japanese during World War II.

His Booker Prize-shortlisted novel Remembering Babylon (1993) is set in northern Australia during the 1850s amid a community of English immigrant farmers (with one Scottish family) whose isolated existence is threatened by the arrival of a stranger, a young white man raised from boyhood by Indigenous Australians.

Malouf has written several collections of short stories, and a play, Blood Relations (1988). Australian critic Peter Craven described Malouf's 2007 short-story collection Every Move You Make as "as formidable and bewitching a collection of stories as you would be likely to find anywhere in the English-speaking world". Craven went on to state that "No one else in this country has: the maintenance of tone, the expertness of prose, the easeful transition between lyrical and realist effects. The man is a master, a superb writer, and also (which is not the same thing) a completely sophisticated literary gent". The Complete Stories appeared in 2007.

Malouf has also written libretti for three operas (including Voss, an adaptation of the novel of the same name by Patrick White and first produced in the 1986 Adelaide Festival of Arts conducted by Stuart Challender), and Baa Baa Black Sheep (with music by Michael Berkeley), which combines a semi-autobiographical story by Rudyard Kipling with Kipling's Jungle Books.

Malouf published his memoir, titled 12 Edmondstone Street, in 1985.

Lecturing
Malouf delivered the 1998 Boyer Lectures on ABC Radio.

Themes and subject matter
Malouf's work tends to be set in Australia, though "a European sensibility" is also present.

His writing is characterised by a heightened sense of spatial relations, from the physical environments into which he takes his readers—whether within or outside built spaces, or in a natural landscape. He has likened each of his succession of novels to the discovery and exploration of a new room in a house, rather than part of an overarching development. "At a certain point, you begin to see what the connections are between things, and you begin to know what space it is you are exploring." From his first novel Johnno onwards, his themes focused on "male identity and soul-searching". He said that much of the male writing that preceded him "was about the world of action. I don't think that was ever an accurate description of men's lives". He identified Patrick White as the writer who turned this around in Australian literature—that White's writing was the kind "that goes behind inarticulacy and or unwillingness to speak, writing that gives the language of feeling to people who don't have it themselves".

Malouf also said that "I knew that the world around you is only uninteresting if you can't see what is really going on. The place you come from is always the most exotic place you'll ever encounter because it is the only place where you recognise how many secrets and mysteries there are in people's lives". However, after nearly four decades of writing, he concluded that in older writers can sometimes be found "a fading of the intensity of the imagination, and ... of the interest in the tiny details of life and behaviour—you see [writers] getting a bit impatient with that."

Awards and honours
As well as his numous accolades for fiction, Malouf was awarded the Pascall Prize for Critical Writing in 1988. In 2008, Malouf won the Australian Publishers Association's Lloyd O'Neil Award for outstanding service to the Australian book industry. He was elected a Fellow of the Royal Society of Literature in 2008. He is also an Honorary Fellow of the Australian Academy of the Humanities.

1974: Grace Leven Prize for Poetry, for Neighbours in a Thicket: Poems
1974: Townsville Foundation for Australian Literary Studies Award, for Neighbours in a Thicket: Poems
1974: Australian Literature Society Gold Medal, for Neighbours in a Thicket: Poems
1974: Colin Roderick Award, for Neighbours in a Thicket: Poems
1979: New South Wales Premier's Literary Awards, Christina Stead Prize for Fiction, for An Imaginary Life
1982: The Age Book of the Year Award, for Fly Away Peter
1983: Australian Literature Society Gold Medal, for Child's Play and Fly Away Peter
1985: Victorian Premier's Literary Award, for Antipodes
1990: National Library of Australia National Audio Book-of-the-Year Award joint winner, for The Great World
1991 Miles Franklin Award, for The Great World
1991: Commonwealth Writers' Prize (South East Asia and South Pacific Region, Best Book from the Region Award), for The Great World
1991: Commonwealth Writers Prize, Overall Best Book Award, for The Great World
1991: Prix Femina Étranger, for The Great World
1991: Honorary doctorate from the University of Queensland
1992: Adelaide Festival Awards for Literature, National Fiction Award, for The Great World
1993: New South Wales Premier's Literary Awards, Christina Stead Prize for Fiction, for Remembering Babylon
1993: Booker Prize shortlist, for Remembering Babylon
1994: Prix Femina Étranger, for Remembering Babylon
1994: Commonwealth Writers Prize, South-East Asia and South Pacific Region, Best Book from the Region Award, for Remembering Babylon
1994: Los Angeles Times Book Prize for Fiction, for Remembering Babylon
1994: National Book Council Banjo Award for Fiction shortlist, for Remembering Babylon
1995: Prix Baudelaire (France), for Remembering Babylon
1996: International Dublin Literary Award, for Remembering Babylon
1996: The Age Book of the Year Award shortlist, for The Conversations at Curlow Creek
1997: Miles Franklin Award shortlist, for The Conversations at Curlow Creek
2000: Neustadt International Prize for Literature
2007: The Age Book of the Year Award for Fiction, for Every Move You Make
2007: The Queensland Premier's Literary Awards, Australian Short Story Collection – Arts Queensland Steele Rudd Award
2008: Australia-Asia Literary Award, for The Complete Stories
2009: Q150 Icons of Queensland for his role as an "Influential Artist", announced as part of the Q150 celebrations
2009: John D. Criticos Prize for Greek literature, for Ransom
2011: International Dublin Literary Award shortlist, for Ransom
2011: International Booker Prize shortlist
2014: Kenneth Slessor Prize for Poetry, New South Wales Premier's Literary Awards, for Earth Hour
2016: Australia Council Award for Lifetime Achievement in Literature

Selected bibliography

Novels
 Johnno (1975)
 An Imaginary Life (1978)
 Harland's Half Acre (1984)
 The Great World (1990)
 Remembering Babylon (1993)
 The Conversations at Curlow Creek (1996)
 Ransom (2009)

Novella
 Fly Away Peter (1982)

Short story collections
 Child's Play (1982)
 Antipodes (1985)
 Untold Tales (1999)
 Dream Stuff (2000)
 Every Move You Make (2006)
 The Complete Stories (2007)

Poetry collections
 Bicycle and Other Poems (1970)
 Neighbours in a Thicket: Poems (1974)
 Poems 1975–76 (1976)
 First Things Last (1980)
 Wild Lemons: Poems (1980)
 Selected Poems 1959–1989 (1992)
 Guide to the Perplexed and Other Poems (chapbook: Warners Bay, New South Wales: Picaro Press, 2007, 16pp)
 Typewriter Music (St Lucia: University of Queensland Press, 2007, 82pp)
 Revolving Days: Selected Poems (2008)
 
 An Open Book (2018), University of Queensland Press,

Non-fiction
 12 Edmondstone St (memoir – 1985)
 "A Spirit of Play: The Making of Australian Consciousness", Boyer Lectures (1998)
 
 Made in England: Australia's British inheritance (Quarterly Essay, Black Inc – QE12 - November 2003)
 On Experience (Little Books on Big Themes – 2008)
 "The Happy Life" (Quarterly Essay, Black Inc – 2011)
 The Writing Life: Book 2 (2014)

Plays
 Blood Relations (1988)

Libretti
 Voss (1986, music: Richard Meale)
 Mer de glace (1991, music: Richard Meale)
 Baa Baa Black Sheep (1993)
 Jane Eyre (2000)

References

Further reading
Giffuni, Cathe. "The Prose of David Malouf", Australian & New Zealand Studies in Canada, No. 7, June 1992.
James, Clive. "A Memory called Malouf" New York Review, 21 December 2000.

External links

David Malouf at Random House Australia

1934 births
20th-century Australian dramatists and playwrights
20th-century Australian male writers
20th-century Australian non-fiction writers
20th-century Australian novelists
20th-century Australian poets
20th-century Australian short story writers
20th-century essayists
20th-century Australian LGBT people
20th-century memoirists
21st-century Australian dramatists and playwrights
21st-century Australian male writers
21st-century Australian non-fiction writers
21st-century Australian novelists
21st-century Australian poets
21st-century Australian short story writers
21st-century essayists
21st-century Australian LGBT people
21st-century memoirists
ALS Gold Medal winners
Australian essayists
Australian expatriates in Italy
Australian expatriates in the United Kingdom
Australian gay writers
Australian historical novelists
Australian LGBT novelists
Australian male dramatists and playwrights
Australian male non-fiction writers
Australian male novelists
Australian male poets
Australian male short story writers
Australian memoirists
Australian opera librettists
Australian people of Lebanese descent
Australian people of Portuguese-Jewish descent
Australian Sephardi Jews
Australian social commentators
Fellows of the Royal Society of Literature
Granta people
Jewish Australian writers
Lecturers
LGBT Jews
Living people
Meanjin people
Miles Franklin Award winners
Prix Femina Étranger winners
Australian psychological fiction writers
Queensland Greats
University of Queensland alumni
Writers about activism and social change
Writers from Brisbane
Writers of historical fiction set in antiquity
Writers of historical fiction set in the modern age
Australian LGBT poets
Australian LGBT dramatists and playwrights